Horsfieldia parviflora is a species of plant in the family Myristicaceae. It is a tree found in the Moluccas and Singapore.

References

parviflora
Trees of the Maluku Islands
Least concern plants
Taxonomy articles created by Polbot
Taxa named by James Sinclair (botanist)